Stephanie Rose is a Filipino-Australia beauty titleholder, model, actress and philanthropist. She was crowned Miss Philippines-Australia in October 2011, she has since then gone on to modeling, acting and active charity work.

Biography
Stephanie Rose was born in Australia to a Filipino mother Chelsea and a Scottish father Timothy. She is the eldest of two  siblings, Liam and Lachlan.

Rose began modelling at 17 and was given her big break in April 2012 during a public relations tour in Manila. She made several television appearances on Eat Bulaga as a guest judge, Showtime! And Wil Time Big Time. She was discovered by Vic Del Rosario, CEO of Viva Films Philippines and was offered a 5-year movie contract.

She stars as the leading lady in Marvin Ong's film, Ayoko Na, directed by Carlo Alvarez.

References

Australian beauty pageant winners
Living people
Year of birth missing (living people)